Marjet Joan Ockels (12 November 1943 – 14 May 2016) was a Dutch politician. She was a member of the House of Representatives between 1991 and 1994. She started as member of the Labour Party, but left in 1993 and continued as an independent.

Career
Ockels was born on 12 November 1943 in Almelo. She worked at a general practice clinic for twenty years. She was a member of the municipal council of Ulrum for the Labour Party between 3 September 1982 and 1 January 1990, from 29 April 1986 she concurrently served as alderwoman for education, social affairs, employment and fishery. Afterwards she continued as a member of the municipal council of the expanded municipality of Ulrum, which later became the De Marne. Her time in office ended on 12 April 1994.

Ockels served in the House of Representatives from 4 June 1991 to 17 May 1994. On 21 September 1993 she left the Labour party and continued as an independent. She was discontent with the internal relations within the fraction. Fellow Labour Party MP's  and Piet de Visser had left the party one year before, also citing internal party differences.

She was sister of Wubbo Ockels. Ockels died in Zoutkamp on 14 May 2016, aged 72.

References

1943 births
2016 deaths
Independent politicians in the Netherlands
Labour Party (Netherlands) politicians
Members of the House of Representatives (Netherlands)
Municipal councillors in Groningen (province)
People from Almelo